Pesto is a sauce that traditionally consists of crushed garlic, European pine nuts, coarse salt, basil leaves, and hard cheese such as Parmigiano-Reggiano (also known as Parmesan cheese) or Pecorino Sardo (cheese made from sheep's milk), all blended with olive oil. It originated in Genoa, the capital city of Liguria, Italy.

Etymology 

Pesto alla Genovese (in English: Genoese Pesto); refers to the original dish.

The name pesto is the past participle of the Genoese verb , which means "to pound," "to crush," in reference to the original method of preparation. According to tradition, the ingredients are "crushed" or ground in a marble mortar through a circular motion of a wooden pestle. This same Latin root, through Old French, also gave rise to the English noun pestle. Incidentally, the Latin root seems to be similar to the Sanskrit adjective pishta, which means to "ground," "pounded," "crushed." 
Strictly speaking, pesto is a generic term for anything made by pounding; that is why the word is used for several pestos in Italy. Nonetheless, pesto alla genovese ("Genoese pesto") remains the most popular pesto in Italy and the rest of the world.

History 

Pesto is thought to have had two predecessors in ancient times, going back as far as the Roman age. The ancient Romans used to eat a similar paste called moretum, which was made by crushing garlic, salt, cheese, herbs, olive oil, and vinegar (and sometimes pine nuts) together. The use of this paste in the Roman cuisine is mentioned in the Appendix Vergiliana, an ancient collection of poems in which the author details the preparation of moretum. During the Middle Ages, a popular sauce in the Genoan cuisine was agliata, which was a mash of garlic and walnuts, as garlic was a staple in the nutrition of Ligurians, especially for the seafarers.

The introduction of basil, the main ingredient of modern pesto, occurred in more recent times and is first documented only in the mid-19th century when gastronomist Giovanni Battista Ratto published his book La Cuciniera Genovese in 1863:

"Take a clove of garlic, basil or, when that is lacking, marjoram and parsley, grated Dutch and Parmigiano cheese and mix them with pine nuts and crush it all together in a mortar with a little butter until reduced to a paste. Then dissolve it with good and abundant oil. Lasagne and Trofie are dressed with this mash, made more liquid by adding a little hot water without salt."

Although likely originating from and being domesticated in India, basil took the firmest root in the regions of Liguria, Italy, and Provence, France. It was abundant in this part of Italy, though only when in season, which is why marjoram and parsley are suggested as alternatives when basil is lacking. Ratto mentions Dutch cheese (formaggio olandese) instead of Pecorino Sardo since Northern European cheeses were common in Genoa at the time, thanks to the centuries-long commercial trades of the maritime republic.

This recipe for pesto alla genovese was often revised in the following years (a noted revision by Emanuele Rossi occurred in 1865, only a couple of years after Ratto's Cuciniera), and it shortly became a staple in the Ligurian culinary tradition, with each family often featuring its own pesto recipe (with slight differences to the traditional ingredients). This is the main reason why pesto recipes often differ from each other.

Pesto recipes began circulating in American newspapers as early as the late 1920s, per a syndicated recipe by George Rector that was copyrighted in 1928. In 1944, The New York Times mentioned an imported canned pesto paste. In 1946, Sunset magazine published a pesto recipe by Angelo Pellegrini. Pesto became popular in North America in the 1980s and 1990s.

Ingredients and preparation 
Pesto is traditionally prepared in a marble mortar with a wooden pestle. First, garlic and pine nuts are placed in the mortar and reduced to a cream, and then the washed and dried basil leaves are added with coarse salt and ground to a creamy consistency. Only then is a mix of Parmigiano-Reggiano and Pecorino added. To help incorporate the cheese, a little extra-virgin olive oil is added. In a tight jar (or simply in an air-tight plastic container), covered by a layer of extra-virgin olive oil, pesto can last in the refrigerator for up to a week and can be frozen for later use.

Accompaniments 

Pesto is commonly used on pasta, traditionally with mandilli de sæa ("silk handkerchiefs" in the Genoese dialect), trofie or trenette. Potatoes and string beans are also traditionally added to the dish, boiled in the same pot in which the pasta has been cooked. Pasta, mixed with pesto, has become a well-known dish in many countries today, with countless recipes being posted online for "pasta with pesto."

It is used in Genovese minestrone. Outside of Italy, pesto is sometimes served with sliced beef, tomatoes, and sliced boiled potatoes.

Variations 
Pesto comes in a variety of recipes, some traditional and some modern, as the very noun pesto is a generic term for anything that is made by pounding.

The original pesto alla genovese, the quintessential pesto recipe, is made with Genovese basil, coarse salt, garlic, Ligurian extra virgin olive oil (Taggiasco), European pine nuts (sometimes toasted) and a grated cheese like Parmigiano-Reggiano or Grana Padano and Pecorino Sardo or Pecorino Romano. A proposal is under preparation by the Palatifini Association to have pesto alla genovese included in the UNESCO intangible cultural heritage list. There is a biennial international Genovese Pesto al Mortaio competition in which 100 finalists use traditional mortars and pestles as well as the above ingredients which 30 local and international judges then assess.

A slightly different version of this sauce exists in Provence, where it is known as pistou. In contrast to pesto alla genovese, pistou is generally made with olive oil, basil, and garlic only: while cheese may be added, usually no nuts are included in a traditional pistou because no pine trees grow there to provide the nuts. Pistou is used in the typical soupe au pistou, a hearty vegetable soup with pistou flavour. The sauce did not originally contain basil; cheese and olive oil were the main constituents.

Outside of Italy, sometimes, almond, Brazil, cashew, hazelnut, macadamia, pecan, pistachio, walnut, or even peanuts are used instead of pine nuts, and sometimes coriander, dill, kale, mint, parsley, rocket, spinach, or wild garlic leaves are mixed in with the basil leaves. It has been pointed out that any combination of flavourful leaves, oily nuts, hard cheese, olive oil, garlic, salt, and lemon juice can produce a pesto-like condiment.

Pesto alla siciliana, sometimes called pesto rosso (red pesto), is a sauce from Sicily similar to pesto alla genovese but with the addition of tomato and almonds instead of pine nuts, and much less basil.

Pesto alla calabrese is a sauce from Calabria consisting of (grilled) bell peppers, black pepper, and more; these ingredients give it a distinctively spicy taste.

Outside Italy, the household name pesto has been used for all sorts of cold sauces or dips, mostly without any of the original ingredients: coriander, dill, kale, mint, parsley, rocket, spinach, or wild garlic (instead of or in addition to basil), artichokes, black olives, green olives, lemon peel, lime peel, or mushrooms. In more northern countries, ramson leaves are sometimes used instead of basil. In the 19th century, Genovese immigrants to Argentina brought pesto recipes with them. A Peruvian variety, known as tallarines verdes (meaning "green noodles," from Italian tagliarini), is slightly creamier, lacks pine nuts (because of their rarity and prohibitive cost in Peru), may use spinach and vegetable oil (in place of olive oil), and is sometimes served with roasted potatoes and sirloin steak.

Vegan pesto variations can include mixes of fresh basil, pine nuts or other nuts, olive oil, miso paste, and nutritional yeast to provide additional flavour enhancement to the dish.

Non-traditional variants of pesto 
For reasons of expense or availability, almond, Brazil nut, cashew, hazelnut, macadamia, pecan, pistachio, walnut, or even peanuts are sometimes substituted for the traditional pine nuts. Also, while the nuts are traditionally raw, some recipes call for prior toasting or roasting. While not traditional, other nuts may be used due to the taste disturbances that some people may experience after consuming pine nuts (see pine mouth). Many online recipes in English for pesto will also list black pepper or white pepper among the ingredients, which are not present in the traditional Genoese recipe.
For reasons of expense, in pestos sold in supermarkets, the extra virgin olive oil is often replaced with cheaper oils such as corn oil, cottonseed oil, grapeseed oil, peanut oil, rapeseed oil, safflower oil, soya oil, sunflower oil, or other vegetable oils. Some manufacturers of pesto for European supermarkets also use filling material like potato flakes or potato starch, which softens the traditionally strong flavour.
Certain pesto recipes abroad replace basil or pine nuts with other herbs and greens, such as:
 Coconut
 Avocado and parsley
 Carrots, coriander and cumin
 Turmeric
 Ginger
Perilla leaf

See also 

 Chimichurri
 Corzetti
 Green sauce
 Gremolata
 Kroeung
 Moretum
 Persillade
 Pistou
 Cuisine of Liguria
 List of Italian dishes
 Picada

References

External links 

 

Cuisine of Liguria
Food paste
Italian sauces
Italian words and phrases